Bheri may refer to:

 Bheri Zone, a former administrative division of Nepal.
 Bheri River, a river in Nepal.
 Bheri, Jajarkot, a municipality in Jajarkot district in Nepal.

See also 
 Sani Bheri River
 Thuli Bheri River